The 2019 season was the 112th season in which the Richmond Football Club participated in the VFL/AFL. The season ended with the club winning its 12th league premiership.

2018 off-season list changes

Retirements and delistings

Free agency

  received an end of second round compensation pick for Reece Conca, however this pick was later withdrawn due to signing Tom Lynch

Trades

National draft

Rookie draft

Pre-season supplemental selection period

Mid-season draft

2019 squad

2019 season

Pre-season

JLT Community Series

Home and away season

Finals

Ladder

Awards

League awards

All-Australian team

Brownlow Medal tally

Rising Star
Nominations:

22 Under 22 team

Club awards

Jack Dyer Medal

Michael Roach Medal

Reserves
The 2019 season marked the sixth consecutive year the Richmond Football club ran a stand-alone reserves team in the Victorian Football League (VFL). Richmond senior and rookie-listed players who were not selected to play in the AFL side were eligible to play for the team alongside a small squad of VFL-only listed players. The team was captained by former AFL-listed defender Steve Morris. The team finished the home and away season with 16 wins and two losses, winning a second straight minor premiership. AFL-listed midfielder Marlion Pickett won the Norm Goss Memorial Medal as the best on ground that day.

VFL listed defender Daniel Coffield won the team's best and fairest award while three players tied for the goal kicking award (21 goals), Jacob Townsend, Dan Butler and Mabior Chol.

Playing squad

Women's team
The 2019 season was the second year the Richmond Football Club ran a team in the VFL Women's competition (VFLW). The team finished the season with nine wins and five losses, placing 4th on the ladder of 13 teams and earning a finals berth. There they were eliminated in a loss to the Western Bulldogs. AFLW-listed midfielder Monique Conti won the club's best and fairest award. Conti also was runner's up in the league best and fairest award.

Playing squad

References

External links 
 Richmond Tigers Official AFL Site
 Official Site of the Australian Football League

Richmond Football Club seasons
Richmond